Rostislav Glebovich (died 1165) was the prince of Minsk between 1146 and 1165, and was the son of Gleb Vseslavich.

References and sources

Rurik dynasty
12th-century princes in Kievan Rus'
Eastern Orthodox monarchs
Year of birth unknown
1165 deaths